The Legend of Bhagat Singh is a 2002 Indian Hindi-language biographical period film directed by Rajkumar Santoshi. The film is about Bhagat Singh, a revolutionary who fought for Indian independence along with fellow members of the Hindustan Socialist Republican Association. It features Ajay Devgan as the titular character along with Sushant Singh, D. Santosh and Akhilendra Mishra as the other lead characters. Raj Babbar, Farida Jalal and Amrita Rao play supporting roles. The film chronicles Singh's life from his childhood where he witnesses the Jallianwala Bagh massacre until the day he was hanged to death before the official trial dated 24th March 1931.

The film was produced by Kumar and Ramesh Taurani's Tips Industries on a budget of 200–250 million (about US$4.2–5.2 million in 2002). The story and dialogue were written by Santoshi and Piyush Mishra respectively, while Anjum Rajabali drafted the screenplay. K. V. Anand, V. N. Mayekar and Nitin Chandrakant Desai were in charge of the cinematography, editing and production design respectively. Principal photography took place in Agra, Manali, Mumbai and Pune from January to May 2002. The soundtrack and film score is composed by A. R. Rahman, with the songs "Mera Rang De Basanti" and "Sarfaroshi Ki Tamanna" being well-received in particular.

The Legend of Bhagat Singh was released on 7 June 2002 to generally positive reviews, with the direction, story, screenplay, technical aspects, and the performances of Devgan and Sushant receiving the most attention. However, the film underperformed at the box office, grossing only 129 million (US$2.7 million in 2002). It went on to win two National Film Awards – Best Feature Film in Hindi and Best Actor for Devgn – and three Filmfare Awards from eight nominations.

Plot 

Some officials take three dead bodies covered in white cloth to throw them near a river and burn it but are stopped by the villagers and unveil the bodies. Tragedy strikes when an old woman named Vidyavati also unveils a body only to find her son under the cloth and is terrified to see her son in that condition.

A great strike was gone on 24th March mourning the death of those three youngsters. Meanwhile, at Lahore station Mahatma Gandhi arrives at the station and sees his supporters praising him, except for those youngsters shouting insults against him for not saving the three youngsters, it was revealed that they were Bhagat Singh, Sukhdev and Rajguru respectively. They gift him a crafted black rose and explain to him the reason, Gandhiji tells them that he appreciates their feelings for the country and he could have given his life to save them, but they were on the wrong path of patriotism and didn't want to live. A youngster disagrees with his reply and says that his intention was similar to that of the British government who never wanted to free the three young revolutionaries, and added that Gandhiji never tried his best to free them. Gandhiji also says that he never supports the path of violence. The youngsters still disagreed and concluded that history will ask this question to him forever, continuing the insults for Gandhiji and praising Bhagat Singh, Sukhdev, and Rajguru. Bhagat Singh's father, Kishan Singh secretly greets him. The story later rewinds to past events.
 
Bhagat Singh was born on 28 September 1907, at Banga village of Lyallpur District in Punjab Province of British India. He witnesses some British officials torturing people who were not even guilty, the young Bhagat also hears that the British officials cussed them "Bloody Indians" when he was on his father's lap who was going back after witnessing all the atrocities. At the age of 12, Bhagat takes a solemn vow to free India from the British Raj after witnessing the aftermath of the Jallianwala Bagh massacre. Soon after the massacre, he learns of Mohandas Karamchand Gandhi's satyagraha policies and begins to support the non-cooperation movement, in which thousands of people burn British-made clothing and abandon school, college studies, and government jobs. In February 1922, Gandhi calls off the movement after the Chauri Chaura incident. Feeling betrayed by Gandhi, Bhagat decides to become a revolutionary, and, as an adult, he goes to Cawnpore and joins the Hindustan Republican Association (HRA) in its struggle for India's independence, ending up in prison for his activities. Singh's father, Kishen Singh, bails him out on a fee of ₹60,000 so that he can get him to run a dairy farm and marry a girl named Mannewali. Bhagat runs away from home, leaving a note saying that his love for the country comes first.

When Lala Lajpat Rai is beaten (lathi charged) to death by the police while protesting against the Simon Commission, Bhagat, along with Shivram Hari Rajguru, Sukhdev Thapar and Chandra Shekhar Azad, assassinate John P. Saunders (who is mistaken for James A. Scott who ordered Lala Lajpat Rai's beatdown), a British police officer, on 17 December 1928. Two days later the incident, they were in disguise to escape from the police who started an identification process with the witnesses of the murder to arrest them. Later, in Calcutta, they start to think that their efforts have gone waste and decide to make a plan for an explosion. After meeting Jatindra Nath Das who reluctantly agrees, they learn the bomb-making process and check whether it is successful. Azad starts to worry whether anything may happen to Bhagat, Bhagatis later consoled by Sukhdev and Azad reluctantly agrees. On 8 April 1929, when the British proposed the Trade Disputes and Public Safety Bills, Bhagat, along with Batukeshwar Dutt, initiate a bombing of the Central Legislative Assembly. He and Dutt throw the bombs on empty benches due to their intention to avoid causing casualties. They are subsequently arrested and tried publicly. Bhagat then gives a speech about his ideas of revolution, stating that he wanted to tell the world about the freedom fighters himself rather than let the British misrepresent them as violent people, citing this as the reason for bombing the assembly. Bhagat soon becomes more popular than Gandhi among the Indian populace, in particular the younger generation, laborers, and farmers.

In Lahore Central Jail, Bhagat and all of the other fellow prisoners, including Sukhdev and Rajguru, undertake a 116-day hunger strike to improve the conditions of Indian political prisoners. On the 63rd day, one of Bhagat's partners Jatin Das, dies of cholera in police custody as he could not bear the disease anymore. Meanwhile, Azad, whom the British had repeatedly failed to capture, is ambushed at the Alfred Park in Allahabad on 27 February 1931. The police surround the entire park leading to a shootout; refusing to be captured by the British, Azad commits suicide with the last remaining bullet in his Colt pistol (it was a Luger P08 pistol as shown in the film).

Fearing the growing popularity of the hunger strike amongst the Indian public nationwide, Lord Irwin (the Viceroy of British India) order the re-opening of the Saunders' murder case, which leads to capital death sentences being imposed on Bhagat, Sukhdev, and Rajguru. The Indians hope that Gandhi will use his pact with Irwin as an opportunity to save Bhagat, Sukhdev, and Rajguru's lives. Irwin refuses Gandhi's request for their release. Gandhi reluctantly agrees to sign a pact that includes the clause: "Release of political prisoners except for the ones involved in violence". Bhagat, Sukhdev, and Rajguru are hanged in secrecy on 23rd March 1931 even before their trial on 24th March 1931.

Cast 

 Ajay Devgan as Bhagat Singh
Nakshdeep Singh as Little Bhagat
 Sushant Singh as Sukhdev Thapar
 D. Santosh as Shivram Hari Rajguru
 Akhilendra Mishra as Chandra Shekhar Azad
 Raj Babbar as Kishen Singh Sandhu, Bhagat's father
 Farida Jalal as Vidyawati Kaur Sandhu, Bhagat's mother
 Amrita Rao as Mannewali, Bhagat's fiance
 Mukesh Tewari as Khan Bahadur Mohammad Akbar, Deputy jailor at Lahore Central Jail
 Surendra Rajan as Mohandas Karamchand "M. K." Gandhi alias "Mahatma Gandhi"
 Saurabh Dubey as Pandit Jawaharlal Nehru
 Swaroop Kumar as Motilal Nehru
 Arun Patwardhan as Madan Mohan Malviya
 Kenneth Desai as Subhash Chandra Bose
 Sitaram Panchal as Lala Lajpat Rai
 Bhaswar Chatterjee as Batukeshwar Dutt alias "B. K. Dutt"
 Amit Dhawan as Bhagwati Charan Vora
 Harsh Khurana as Jai Gopal
 Kapil Sharma as Shiv Verma
 Indrani Banerjee as Durgawati Devi a.k.a. "Durga Bhabhi"
 Amitabh Bhattacharjee as Jatindra Nath Das a.k.a. "Jatin Das"
 Shish Khan as Prem Dutt
 Sanjay Sharma as Ajay Ghosh
 Raja Tomer as Mahabir Singh
 Deepak Kumar Bandhu as Ramsaran Das
 Niraj Shah as Gaya Prasad
 Pradeep Bajpai as Kishori Lal
 Aditya Verma as Des Raj
 Romie Jaspal as Sachindranath Sanyal
 Sunil Grover as Jaidev Kapur
 Abir Goswami as Phonindra Nath Ghosh
 Pramod Pathak as Mahour
 Aashu Mohil as Hans Raj Vohra
 Manu Malik as Agya Ram
 Navin Bhaskar as Kawalnath Tiwari
 Shreyas Pandit as Surindernath Pandey
 Rakesh Oon as Markand
 Kiran Randhwa as Police Officer
 Ganesh Yadav as Ram Prasad Bismil
 Tony Mirchandani as Ashfaqulla Khan
 Padam Singh as Thakur Roshan Singh
 Ashok Sharma as Rajendra Lahiri
 Mahesh Raja as Sachindranath Bakshi
 Vikky as Mukundilal
 Piyush Chakravorthy as Banwarilal
 Vasudevan as Murari Sharma
 Narendra Rawal as Manmath Nath Gupta
 Shamsher Singh as Arjan Singh
 Oshima Rekhi as Jai Kaur
 Sukhmani Kohli as Amar Kaur
 Ankush as Kulbir Singh
 Karanbir Singh as Kultar Singh
 Renu Soni as Baddi Chachi
 Anita as Choti Chachi
 Channi Singh as Chattar Singh
 Mahajan Prashant as Justice Rai Sahib
 Hayat Asif as Justice Asaf Ali
 Sardar Sohi as Leader at Jallianwala Bagh
 Rajesh Tripathi as Veerbhadra Tiwari
 Lalit Tiwari as Professor Amarnath Vidyalankar
 Shehzad Khan as Horse-cart driver Khairu 
 Gil Alon as Viceroy Lord Irwin
 Ryan Jonathan as Herbert Emerson, Home Member, His Majesty's Government
 Conrad as Assistant Superintendent of Police John P. Saunders
 Tim as Superintendent of Police James Alexander Scott
 Richard as Reginald Dyer, who ordered Gurkha soldiers to open fire on an unarmed gathering of people at Jallianwala Bagh in 1919.

Production

Development 
In 1998, the film director Rajkumar Santoshi read several books on the socialist revolutionary, Bhagat Singh, and felt that a biopic would help revive interest in him. Although Manoj Kumar made a film about Bhagat in 1965, titled Shaheed, Santoshi felt that despite being "a great source of inspiration on the lyrics and music front", it did not "dwell on Bhagat Singh's ideology and vision". In August 2000, the screenwriter Anjum Rajabali mentioned to Santoshi about his work on Har Dayal, whose revolutionary activities inspired Udham Singh. Santoshi then persuaded Rajabali to draft a script based on Bhagat's life as he was inspired by Udham Singh.

Santoshi gave Rajabali a copy of Shaheed Bhagat Singh, K. K. Khullar's biography of the revolutionary. Rajabali said that reading the book "created an intense curiosity in me about the mind of this man. I definitely wanted to know more about him." His interest in Bhagat intensified after he read The Martyr: Bhagat Singh's Experiments in Revolution (2000) by journalist Kuldip Nayar. The following month, Rajabali formally began his research on Bhagat while admitting to Santoshi that it was "a difficult task". Gurpal Singh, a Film and Television Institute of India graduate, and internet blogger Sagar Pandya assisted him. Santoshi received input from Kultar Singh, Bhagat's younger brother, who told the director he would have his full co-operation if the film accurately depicted Bhagat's ideologies.

Rajabali wanted to "recreate the world that Bhagat Singh lived in", and his research required him to "not only understand the man, but also the influences on him, the politics of that era". In an interview with Sharmila Taliculam of Rediff.com in the year 2000, Rajabali said that the film would "deal with Bhagat Singh, the man, rather than the freedom fighter". Many aspects of Bhagat's life, including his relationship with fiancée Mannewali, were derived from Piyush Mishra's 1994 play Gagan Damama Bajyo; Mishra was subsequently credited with writing the film's dialogues.

A. G. Noorani's 1996 book, The Trial of Bhagat Singh: Politics of Justice, provided the basis for the trial sequences. Gurpal obtained additional information from 750 newspaper clippings of The Tribune dated from September 1928 to March 1931, and from Bhagat's prison notebooks. These gave Rajabali "an idea of what had appealed to the man, the literary and intellectual influences that impacted him in that period". By the end of the year 2000, Santoshi and Rajabali completed work on the script and showed it to Kumar and Ramesh Taurani of Tips Industries; both were impressed by it. The Taurani brothers agreed to produce the film under their banner and commence filming after Santoshi had finished his work on Lajja (2001).

Casting 
Sunny Deol was initially cast as Bhagat, but he left the project owing to schedule conflicts and differences with Santoshi over his remuneration. Santoshi then preferred to cast new faces instead of established actors but was not pleased with the performers who auditioned. Ajay Devgn (then known as Ajay Devgan) was finally chosen for the lead character because Santoshi felt he had "the eyes of a revolutionary. His introvert nature conveys loud and clear signals that there is a volcano inside him ready to burst." After Devgn performed a screen test dressed as Bhagat, Santoshi was "pleasantly surprised" to see Devgn's face closely resemble Singh's and cast him in the part. The Legend of Bhagat Singh marked Devgn's second collaboration with Santoshi after Lajja. Devgn called the film "the most challenging assignment" in his career. He had not watched Shaheed before signing up for the project. To prepare for the role, Devgn studied all the references Santoshi and Rajabali had procured to develop the film's script. He also lost weight to more closely resemble Bhagat.

Santoshi chose Akhilendra Mishra to play Azad as he also resembled his character. In addition to reading Shiv Verma's Sansmritiyan, Mishra read Bhagwan Das Mahore's and Sadashiv Rao Malkapurkar's accounts of the revolutionary. Because of his astrological beliefs, he even obtained Azad's horoscope to determine his personality. In an interview with Rediff.com's Lata Khubchandani, Mishra mentioned that while informing his father about his role of Azad, he revealed to him that they originally hailed from Kanpur, the same place where Azad's ancestors were from. This piece of information encouraged Mishra to play Azad.

Sushant Singh and D. Santosh (in his cinematic debut) were cast as Bhagat's friends and fellow members of the Hindustan Republican Association, Sukhdev Thapar and Shivaram Rajguru. Santoshi believed their faces resembled those of the two revolutionaries. To learn about their characters, Sushant, like Mishra, read Sansmritiyan while Santosh visited Rajguru's family members. The actors were also chosen according to their characters' backgrounds. This was true in the case of Santosh and also Amitabh Bhattacharjee, who played Jatin Das, the man who devised the bomb for Bhagat and Batukeshwar Dutt. Santosh and Bhattacharjee were from Maharashtra and West Bengal like Rajguru and Das. Raj Babbar and Farida Jalal were cast as Bhagat's parents, Kishen Singh and Vidyawati Kaur, while Amrita Rao played Mannewali, Bhagat's fiancée.

Filming 
Principal photography began in January 2002 and was completed in May. The first schedule of filming took place in Agra and Manali following which the unit moved to the Film City studio in Mumbai. According to the film's cinematographer, K. V. Anand, around 85 sets were constructed at Film City by Nitin Chandrakant Desai who was in charge of the production design, and "99 percent of the background" featured in the film was sets. Desai used sepia tint throughout the film to create a period feel.

Additional scenes depicting the massacre of 1919 were filmed at  a set constructed to look like the Bagh as it was 83 years ago; some of them were shot between 9 pm and 6 am. The scenes at the Bagh set and other surrounding locations of Amritsar at the beginning of the film feature Nakshdeep Singh as the younger Bhagat. Santoshi selected Nakshdeep after receiving photographs of the boy from his father, Komal Singh, who played Mannewali's father.

Kultar stayed with the production unit for seven days during the outdoor location shooting in Pune. Both Santoshi and Devgn appreciated the interactions they had with Kultar, noting that he provided "deep insights into his brother's life". Kultar was pleased with the sincerity of the cast and crew and shared private letters written by Bhagat with them. The song "Pagdi Sambhal Jatta" was the last part to be filmed. A sequence in the song featuring Devgn appearing between two factions of backup Bhangra dancers took three takes to be completed. The Legend of Bhagat Singh was made on a budget of 200 – 250 million (about US$4.15 – 5.18 million in 2002).

Music 
A. R. Rahman composed the soundtrack and score for The Legend of Bhagat Singh, marking his second collaboration with Santoshi after Pukar. Sameer wrote the lyrics for the songs. In an interview with Arthur J. Pais of Rediff.com, Rahman said that Santoshi wanted him to compose songs that would stand apart from his other projects like Lagaan (2001) and Zubeidaa (2001). Rahman took care to compose the tunes for "Mera Rang De Basanti" in a slow-paced manner to avoid comparisons with the songs in Shaheed, which he and Santoshi found to be fast-paced. Rahman followed the same procedure for "Sarfaroshi Ki Tamanna". He created a softer tune, saying that the "song is pictured on men who have fasted for over a month. How can I compose a high-sounding tune for that song?" Despite this, Rahman admitted that "Des Mere Des" had "some strains" from Lagaans music. Rahman took "Santoshi's commitment to the film" as a source of inspiration to make an album that was " and different." Rahman experimented with Punjabi music more than he had done before on his previous soundtracks, receiving assistance from Sukhwinder Singh and Sonu Nigam. The soundtrack was completed within two months, with "Des Mere Des" recorded in an hour.

The soundtrack, marketed by Tips, was released on 8 May 2002 in New Delhi. The songs, especially "Mera Rang De Basanti" and "Sarfaroshi Ki Tamanna", received favourable reviews. A review carried by The Hindu said that while "Sarfaroshi Ki Tamanna" had a "forceful" impact, "Mera Rang De Basanti" and "Pagdi Sambhal Jatta" were "not the boom-boom types but subtly tuned". The review praised Rahman's ability "to impart the sombre and poignant mood" in all the album's songs "so well that despite being subdued, it retains the patriotic fervour". Seema Pant of Rediff.com said that "Mera Rang De Basanti" and "Mahive Mahive" were "well rendered" by their respective singers and called "Sura So Pahchaniye" an "intense track, both lyrically as well as composition wise". Pant praised Sukhwinder Singh's "exquisite rendition" of "Pagdi Sambhal Jatta" and described the duet version of "Sarfaroshi Ki Tamanna" as having "been beautifully composed". She appreciated how the "tabla, santoor and flute gives this slow and soft number a classical touch." A critic from Sify said the music is "good". While Pant and the Sify reviewer concurred with Rahman that "Des Mere Des" was similar to Lagaans music, the review in The Hindu compared the song to "Bharat Hum Ko Jaan Se Pyaara Hain" ("Thamizha Thamizha") from Roja (1992).

Release 
The Legend of Bhagat Singh was released on 7 June 2002 coinciding with the release of Sanjay Gadhvi's romance, Mere Yaar Ki Shaadi Hai, and another film based on Bhagat, 23rd March 1931: Shaheed, which featured Bobby Deol as the revolutionary.

A week before the film's release, Article 51 A Forum, a non-governmental organisation in Delhi, believed The Legend of Bhagat Singh to be historically inaccurate, criticising the inclusion of Mannewali as Bhagat's widow, and stating the films were made "without any research or devotion" and the filmmakers were just looking at the box-office prospects to "make spicy films based on imaginary episodes". Kumar Taurani defended his film saying that he did not add Rao "for ornamental value", noting he would have opted for an established actress instead if that were the case. A press statement issued by Tips Industries said: "This girl from Manawali village loved Bhagat Singh so totally that she remained unmarried till death and was known as Bhagat Singh's widow." The chief operating officer of Tips Industries, Raju Hingorani, pointed out that Kultar had authenticated the film, stating: "With his backing, why must we be afraid of other allegations?"

On 29 May 2002, a 14-page petition was filed by Paramjit Kaur, the daughter of Bhagat's youngest brother, Rajinder Singh, at the Punjab and Haryana High Court to stay the release of both The Legend of Bhagat Singh and 23rd March 1931: Shaheed, alleging that they "contained distorted versions" of the freedom fighter's life. Kaur's lawyer, Sandeep Bhansal, argued that Bhagat singing a duet with Mannewali and wearing garlands were "untrue and amounted to distortion of historical facts". Two days later, the petition came up for hearing before the Judges Justice J. L. Gupta and Justice Narinder Kumar Sud; both refused to stay the films' release, observing that the petition was moved "too late and it would not be proper to stop the screening of the films".

Reception

Critical response 

The Legend of Bhagat Singh received generally positive critical feedback, with praise for its direction, story, screenplay, cinematography, production design and the performances of Devgn and Sushant. Chitra Mahesh praised Santoshi's direction, noting in her review for The Hindu that he "shows some restraint in handling the narrative". She appreciated the film's technical aspects and Devgn's rendition, calling his interpretation of Bhagat "powerful, without being strident". Writing for The Times of India, Dominic Ferrao commended Devgn, Sushant, Babbar and Mishra, saying that they all come "off with flying colours". A review carried by Sify labelled the film "slick and commendable"; it also termed Devgn's portrayal of Bhagat as "fabulous" but felt he "overrides" the character and that "the supporting characters make more impact than him."

In a comparative analysis of The Legend of Bhagat Singh with 23rd March 1931: Shaheed, Ziya-Us-Salam of The Hindu found the former to be a better film because of the "clearly etched out" supporting characters, while opining Devgn was more "restrained and credible" than Bobby Deol. Salam admired Sushant's performance, opining that he has "a fine screen presence, good timing and an ability to hold his own in front of more celebrated actors". In a more mixed comparison, Rediff.com's Amberish K. Diwanji, despite finding The Legend of Bhagat Singh and Devgn to be the better film and actor like Salam, criticised the "constant shouting and mouthing of dialogues". He responded negatively to the inclusion of Bhagat's fiancée, pointing out the film took liberties in using this "slim" piece of information "just to have a girl sing." Diwanji, however, commended the narrative structure of The Legend of Bhagat Singh, saying that the film captured the revolutionary's life and journey well, thereby making it "worth watching and give[ing] it relevant historical background."

Among overseas reviewers, Dave Kehr of The New York Times complimented the placement of the film's song sequences, especially that of "Sarfaroshi Ki Tamanna" and "Mere Rang De Basanti". Kehr called Devgn's interpretation of Bhagat "glowering" while praising Sushant's "urbane and unpredictable" rendition of Sukhdev. Although Varietys Derek Elley found The Legend of Bhagat Singh to be "drawn with more warmth" and approved of Devgn's and Sushant's performances, he was not pleased with the "choppy" screenplay in the film's first half. He concluded his review by saying that the film "has a stronger lead [thespian] and richer gallery of characters that triumph over often unsubtle direction".

Some of the criticism was also directed towards the treatment of Gandhi. Mahesh notes that he "appears in rather poor light" and was depicted as making "little effort" to secure a pardon for Bhagat, Sukhdev and Rajguru. Diwanji concurs with Mahesh while also saying that the Gandhi–Irwin Pact as seen in the film would make the audience think that Gandhi "condemned the trio to be hanged by inking the agreement" while pointing out the agreement itself "had a different history and context." Kehr believed the film's depiction of Gandhi was its "most interesting aspect". He described Surendra Rajan's version of Gandhi as "a faintly ridiculous poseur, whose policies play directly into the hands of the British" and in that aspect, he was very different from "the serene sage" portrayed by Ben Kingsley in Richard Attenborough's Gandhi (1982). Like Diwanji, Elley also notes how the film denounces Gandhi by blaming him "for not trying very hard" to prevent Bhagat's execution.

Box office 
The Legend of Bhagat Singh had an average opening in its first week, grossing 57.1 million (US$1.18 million in 2002) worldwide, with 33 million (US$684,221 in 2002) in India alone. The film failed to cover its budget thus underperforming at the box office, collecting only 129.35 million (US$2.68 million in 2002) by the end of its theatrical run. Shubhra Gupta of Business Line attributed the film's commercial failure to its release on the same day as 23rd March 1931: Shaheed, opining that "the two Bhagats ate into each other's business".

Accolades 

At the 50th National Film Awards, The Legend of Bhagat Singh won the Best Feature Film in Hindi and Devgn received the Best Actor award. The film received three nominations at the 48th Filmfare Awards and won three—Best Background Score (Rahman), Best Film (Critics) (Kumar Taurani, Ramesh Taurani) and Best Actor (Critics) (Devgn).

Legacy 
Since its release, The Legend of Bhagat Singh has been considered one of Santoshi's best works. Devgan said in December 2014 that The Legend of Bhagat Singh along with Zakhm (1998) were the best films he ever worked on in his career. He also revealed he had not seen such a good script since. In 2016, the film was included in Hindustan Timess list of "Bollywood's Top 5 Biopics". The Legend of Bhagat Singh was added in both the SpotBoyE and The Free Press Journal lists of Bollywood films that can be watched to celebrate India's Independence Day in 2018. The following year, Daily News and Analysis and Zee News also listed it among the films to watch on Republic Day.

See also

 List of artistic depictions of Mahatma Gandhi

Notes

References

Film

External links 
 Official website
 
 
 

2000s Hindi-language films
2000s biographical films
2002 films
Best Hindi Feature Film National Film Award winners
Cultural depictions of Jawaharlal Nehru
Cultural depictions of Mahatma Gandhi
Films about Bhagat Singh
Films directed by Rajkumar Santoshi
Films featuring a Best Actor National Award-winning performance
Films scored by A. R. Rahman
Films set in 1931
Films set in Lahore
Films set in the British Raj
Hindi-language films based on actual events
Indian films based on actual events
Indian historical films